Fjord is a municipality in Møre og Romsdal county, Norway. It is located in the traditional district of Sunnmøre. The administrative centre of the municipality is the village of Stordal. Other villages in the municipality include Valldal, Eidsdal, Norddal, Tafjord, Fjørå/Selboskarbygda, Sylte. The name Fjord is a common word and name part in Norway and was chosen for the new municipality established in 2020 for reasons of search engine optimization, despite not having any historical tradition in the municipality.

The  municipality is the 92nd largest by area out of the 356 municipalities in Norway. Fjord is the 253rd most populous municipality in Norway with a population of 2,491.

General information
The municipality was established on 1 January 2020 after the government of Norway approved the merger of the two neighboring municipalities of Stordal and Norddal.

Name
The name Fjord has no historical basis or tradition in the area; according to the municipality, the name was chosen in 2020 because of a desire to optimize search engine results and that it wanted Google results for the common word "fjord" to be dominated by the municipality in order to attract tourists.

The official Language Council of Norway criticized the name of the municipality and stated that "fjord is a common word that has been appropriated as the name of a municipality, which we opposed." The council also stated that it is an important principle that municipal names should be based on names with a historical tradition in the area, and that "invented names" with no tradition such as Fjord are unfortunate.

Coat of arms
The coat of arms for the municipality is a blue and white depiction of mountains on either side of a fjord, symbolizing the Storfjorden which flows through the municipality and is designed by Dag Øistein Endsjø.

Churches
The Church of Norway has two parishes within the municipality of Fjord: Norddal og Stordal. They are part of the Austre Sunnmøre prosti (deanery) in the Diocese of Møre.

Geography

Fjord municipality is located along the inner Storfjorden and around the Norddalsfjorden and the Tafjorden which flow west to east. The majority of the municipality lies east and south of the fjord, while a small previously inhabited mountainous area on the west side of the fjord is also part of Fjord. Ytste Skotet is a preserved historic farm/museum that is located on the steep mountainsides on the west side of the fjord. Most of the municipality surrounds the Stordalen valley and the Valldalen valley, both on the east side of the fjord.

The large Valldalen valley runs to the northeast from the Norddalsfjorden. The valleys are surrounded by the Tafjordfjella mountain range. The mountains Puttegga, Karitinden, and Tordsnose sit on the eastern border of the municipality. The mountain Høgstolen lies in the northern part of the municipality. Reinheimen National Park is located partially in the municipality of Fjord.
Tafjorden is part of the UNESCO World Heritage Site West Norwegian Fjords.

Climate
Norwegian Meteorological Institute has recorded temperature in Tafjord since 1925, documenting a temperate oceanic climate (marine west coast climate; Köppen climate zone: Cfb). The all-time high  was recorded July 1945, and the all-time low  in January 1942. Tafjord,  in a narrow fjord area surrounded by high mountains, often experiences foehn in winter when strong Atlantic lows pushes mild air towards the coast. The average date for the last overnight freeze (low below ) in spring is 17 April and average date for first freeze in autumn is 24 October giving a frost-free season of 189 days (1981-2010 average).

Government
All municipalities in Norway, including Fjord, are responsible for primary education (through 10th grade), outpatient health services, senior citizen services, unemployment and other social services, zoning, economic development, and municipal roads. The municipality is governed by a municipal council of elected representatives, which in turn elects a mayor.  The municipality falls under the Møre og Romsdal District Court and the Frostating Court of Appeal.

Municipal council
The municipal council  of Fjord is made up of 23 representatives that are elected to four year terms. The party breakdown of the council is as follows:

Notable people 
 Martin Linge, DSC (1894 in Norddal – 1941) an actor, he worked for SOE in WWII
 Marta Schumann (1919 in Valldal – 1994) a novelist, poet and short story writer
 Almar Heggen (1933 in Norddal – 2014) a Norwegian opera singer 
 Stian Omenås (born 1980 in Valldal) a Norwegian jazz musician (trumpet), music conductor and composer

References

External links
Municipal fact sheet from Statistics Norway 

 
Stordal
Norddal
Municipalities of Møre og Romsdal
2020 establishments in Norway
Populated places established in 2020